James Praed (ca. 16551706) was an English  politician who sat in the House of Commons in 1681 and between 1689 and 1705.

Praed was the son of James Praed  of Trevethoe, Cornwall and his wife Horor Gifford, daughter of Arthur Gifford of Birghtley, Devon. He matriculated at Exeter College, Oxford on 27 June 1671 aged 15 and entered Middle Temple in 1674. He was a colonel in the militia.

In 1681, Praed was elected Member of Parliament for St Ives. He was re-elected MP for St Ives in 1689 and sat until 1705. During his time in parliament he had considerable periods of absence. He voted for the Tack and was defeated at the election in 1705. He was recorder of Penzance from 1693 until his death in 1706, and stannator for Penwith and Kerrier in 1703. 

Praed married Lucy Basset, daughter of John Basset of Tehidy, Illogan, Cornwall shortly before his death. He left all his personal property to his wife and his encumbered estates to his brother John.

References

1655 births
1706 deaths
Members of the pre-1707 English Parliament for constituencies in Cornwall
English MPs 1681
English MPs 1689–1690
English MPs 1690–1695
English MPs 1695–1698
English MPs 1698–1700
English MPs 1701
English MPs 1701–1702
English MPs 1702–1705